The South Mountain gray-cheeked salamander (Plethodon meridianus) is a species of salamander in the family Plethodontidae, endemic to the state of North Carolina in the United States, where it is only found in the South Mountains. It was formerly considered a variant of the red-cheeked salamander (P. jordani). Its natural habitat is temperate forests. It is threatened by habitat loss.

References

Amphibians of the United States
Plethodon
Taxonomy articles created by Polbot
Amphibians described in 2000
Endemic fauna of North Carolina